Martin Hámor (born 9 March 1943) is a Slovak archer. He competed in the men's individual event at the 1992 Summer Olympics.

References

1943 births
Living people
Slovak male archers
Olympic archers of Czechoslovakia
Archers at the 1992 Summer Olympics
People from Poltár District
Sportspeople from the Banská Bystrica Region